Ahmad Meyghani (also spelled Meighani and Mighani) is an Iranian retired fighter pilot who currently serves as the second-in-command to the General Staff deputy for strategy. Before, he served as the commander of Iranian army's air force and following the split of the air defense from the force, he was appointed as the inaugural commander of the latter. He piloted an F-14 and has training with the aircraft.

References

Living people
Islamic Republic of Iran Army brigadier generals
Commanders of Islamic Republic of Iran Air Force
1957 births
Commanders of Islamic Republic of Iran Army Air Defense
Islamic Republic of Iran Army personnel of the Iran–Iraq War